Debra Lynn Waters is a New Zealand exercise physiologist and medical researcher in the field of health ageing, director of Gerontology Research and professor at the University of Otago.

Academic career 
With a BS and PhD, exercise physiologist Waters moved from University of New Mexico, where she retains the role of adjunct professor, to the University of Otago in New Zealand in 2005. In December 2019 Waters was promoted to full professor at the University of Otago with effect from 1 February 2020. 

Waters has led research into falls prevention through the Steady As You Go program since 2010. Early in 2019 Waters and Louise Parr-Brownlie were appointed joint directors of New Zealand's Ageing Well National Science Challenge. The program conducts research into health ageing, including ageing and Māori and researchers in universities across New Zealand participate.

Waters became editor-in-chief of the Australasian Journal on Ageing in January 2021. She is on the editorial board of The Journal of Frailty & Aging and an editor of Annals of Geriatric Medicine and Research.

Selected works

References 

Living people
Year of birth missing (living people)
Academic staff of the University of Otago
University of New Mexico faculty
New Zealand women academics
New Zealand women scientists
Exercise physiologists